Gingicithara notabilis is a species of sea snail, a marine gastropod mollusk in the family Mangeliidae.

Description
The shell of the adult snail varies between 4 mm and 6 mm.

The spiral striations are deep and are placed in pairs. The yellowish bands are not very conspicuous, but on the back of the body whorl one of them at the suture and one in the middle of the outer lip become of a deep brown or chestnut colour.

Distribution
This marine species occurs off South Africa, Madagascar, Réunion, Mauritius, Sri Lanka and New Caledonia

References

External links
 Tucker, J.K. 2004 "Catalog of recent and fossil turrids (Mollusca: Gastropoda)". Zootaxa. 682:1–1295.
 Kilburn R.N. 1992. Turridae (Mollusca: Gastropoda) of southern Africa and Mozambique. Part 6. Subfamily Mangeliinae, section 1. Annals of the Natal Museum, 33: 461–575
 
 MNHN, Paris: Gingicithara notabilis

notabilis
Gastropods described in 1888